Music Center the Netherlands (MCN) is an organization that promotes and archives Dutch professional music. It aims to strengthens the position of Dutch music and music culture in the Netherlands and abroad. It organizes events and informative meetings, workshops, courses; publishes promotional CDs; and attends international music fairs and conventions. It is financially supported by the Dutch government.

The establishment of a national organization for Dutch music was a wish of the 2007 government, and it led to MCN's establishment on 1 January 2008. The organization has its headquarters on the Rokin in Amsterdam. It is a merger of seven music institutes: Donemus (documentation center for classical music), Gaudeamus (center for contemporary music), De Kamervraag (center for classical music), Dutch Jazz Organisation, the Dutch Jazz Service, the Netherlands Jazz Archive, and the Dutch Rock and Pop Institute.

One of the organization's on-line publications is the Muziekencyclopedie, an encyclopedia of Dutch bands and artists. In 2009, it helped establish an endowed chair for Jazz and Improvisational Music at the University of Amsterdam.

Activities
 Gaudeamus International Composers Award
 Gaudeamus International Interpreters Award
 Chamber Music Day
 VPRO/Boy Edgar Award
 Dutch Jazz Meeting
 Dutch Blend Meeting
 MusicXport.nl
Pop Media Prijs
 promotional support at international music conventions such as CMJ (New York), SXSW (Austin, Texas), Popkomm (Berlin) and Musikmesse (Frankfurt am Main, Germany)

References

External links
Muziek Centrum Nederland
Muziekencyclopedie

Music organisations based in the Netherlands
Organisations based in Amsterdam
2008 establishments in the Netherlands
Organizations established in 2008